Gannan Xiahe Airport  is an airport in Gannan Tibetan Autonomous Prefecture, Gansu Province, China. Construction started in September 2010 with a total investment of 722 million yuan, and the airport was opened on 19 August 2013.

Facilities
The airport has a 3,200 meter runway and a 3,000 square-meter terminal building.  It is projected to handle 140,000 passengers annually by 2020.

Airlines and destinations

See also
List of airports in China
List of the busiest airports in China
List of highest airports

References

Airports in Gansu
Xiahe County
Airports established in 2013
2013 establishments in China